Pairojnoi Sor Siamchai, is a former Thai Muay Thai fighter. He was a Lumpinee stadium champion.

Biography & career
Pairojnoi is an orphan who grew up in the Chachoengsao province, in a temple known for taking care of homeless children. He started Muay Thai training at the age of 9, he had his first fights in the nearby temples.

In 1985 he was scouted by the Songchai promotion and began his ascension at Lumpinee stadium in the 105 lbs division where he became popular for his aggressive style. On August 30, 1988 Pairojnoi won the Lumpinee Stadium title left vacant by Hippy Singmanee against the former champion's brother Kompayak Singmanee.

Pairojnoi's fight against Pongsiri Por Ruamrudee on July 25, 1989 was the headline bout for a card that broke records at Lumpinee stadium with a 3 million baht gate and over 10,000 spectators. On November 4, his second fight against Pongsiri "Rambo" was elected "Fight of the Year" and became known as the fight of the century for Muay Thai.

After his career Pairojnoi became a trainer in various countries. He had a notable contribution to the growth of the Brazilian muay thai scene. He was working at the Kor Romsritong camp until its closure, he then joined the Sitsongpeenong before opening his own gym in Samut Sakhon.

In May 2022, Pairojnoi had emergency heart surgery after he collapsed. He recovered from the operation.

Titles & honours
Lumpinee Stadium
 1988 Lumpinee Stadium Fight of the Year (vs. Pongsiri Por Ruamrudee on November 4th)
 1988 Lumpinee Stadium 105 lbs Champion

Fight record

|- style="background:#fbb;"
| 1996-09-05 || Loss ||align=left| Silachai Vor Preecha || Rajadamnern Stadium || Bangkok, Thailand || Decision ||5 ||3:00 

|- style="background:#fbb;"
| 1996-08-24 || Loss ||align=left| Tukatathong Por Pongsawang || Lumpinee Stadium || Bangkok, Thailand || Decision ||5 ||3:00 

|- style="background:#fbb;"
| 1996-07-06 || Loss ||align=left| Saenchai Jirakriengkrai || Lumpinee Stadium || Bangkok, Thailand || Decision ||5 ||3:00 

|- style="background:#cfc;"
| 1995-08-04 || Win ||align=left| Sak-Ubon Por Muang Ubon || Lumpinee Stadium || Bangkok, Thailand || Decision || 5 || 3:00

|- style="background:#cfc;"
| 1995-05-19 || Win ||align=left| Netnarin Fairtex || Lumpinee Stadium || Bangkok, Thailand || Decision || 5 || 3:00

|- style="background:#;"
| 1995-02- || ||align=left| Silachai Vor Preecha || Lumpinee Stadium || Bangkok, Thailand || ||  || 

|- style="background:#fbb;"
| 1994-12-23 || Loss ||align=left| Sittichai Petchbangprang || Lumpinee Stadium || Bangkok, Thailand || Decision || 5 || 3:00

|- style="background:#fbb;"
| 1994-11-29 || Loss ||align=left| Rattanachai Wor.Walapon || Lumpinee Stadium || Bangkok, Thailand || Decision || 5 || 3:00

|- style="background:#cfc;"
| 1994-07-09 || Win ||align=left| Singthong Lukrangsee || Lumpinee Stadium || Bangkok, Thailand || Decision || 5 || 3:00

|- style="background:#fbb;"
| 1994-04-29 || Loss ||align=left| Pudphadlek Sor.Chalermchai || Lumpinee Stadium || Bangkok, Thailand || Decision || 5 || 3:00

|- style="background:#fbb;"https://www.facebook.com/groups/202177336880295/posts/1215658798865472/
| 1994-01-24 || Loss ||align=left| Kunasin Sor.Jongkit || Rajadamnern Stadium || Bangkok, Thailand || Decision || 5 || 3:00

|- style="background:#fbb;"
| 1994-01-01 || Loss ||align=left| Rambolek Por.Chuanchuen || Lumpinee Stadium || Bangkok, Thailand || Decision || 5 || 3:00

|- style="background:#fbb;"
| 1992-02-22 || Loss ||align=left| Lamnamoon Sor.Sumalee || Lumpinee Stadium || Bangkok, Thailand || Decision || 5 || 3:00

|- style="background:#fbb;"
| 1991-12-10 || Loss ||align=left| Kongklai Sit Kru Od || Lumpinee Stadium || Bangkok, Thailand || Decision ||5 ||3:00

|- style="background:#cfc;"
| 1991-11-26 || Win ||align=left| Lamnamoon Sor.Sumalee || Lumpinee Stadium || Bangkok, Thailand || Decision || 5 || 3:00

|- style="background:#cfc;"
| 1991-07-12 || Win ||align=left| Supernoi Sor Ketalingchan || Lumpinee Stadium || Bangkok, Thailand || KO ||4 || 

|- style="background:#fbb;"
| 1991-06-14 || Loss ||align=left| Nungubon Sitlerchai || Lumpinee Stadium || Bangkok, Thailand || Decision ||5 ||3:00

|- style="background:#fbb;"
| 1991-03-25 || Loss ||align=left| Thongchai Tor.Silachai || Lumpinee Stadium || Bangkok, Thailand || Decision || 5 || 3:00

|- style="background:#fbb;"
| 1991-02-23 || Loss ||align=left| Jaroensap Kiatbanchong || Lumpinee Stadium || Bangkok, Thailand || Decision || 5 || 3:00 
|-
! style=background:white colspan=9 |

|- style="background:#cfc;"
| 1991-01-25|| Win||align=left| Pornsak Muangsurin || Lumpinee Stadium || Bangkok, Thailand || Decision || 5 || 3:00

|- style="background:#cfc;"
| 1990-12-04 || Win ||align=left| Krirkchai Sor Ketalingchan || Lumpinee Stadium || Bangkok, Thailand || Decision|| 5 || 3:00

|- style="background:#cfc;"
| 1990-11-03|| Win||align=left| D-Day Kiatmuangkan || Lumpinee Stadium || Bangkok, Thailand || Decision || 5 || 3:00

|- style="background:#cfc;"
| 1990-10-05|| Win||align=left| Thailand Pinsinchai || Lumpinee Stadium || Bangkok, Thailand || Decision || 5 || 3:00

|- style="background:#fbb;"
| 1990-09-17|| Loss ||align=left| Sornsuknoi Sakwichian || Lumpinee Stadium || Bangkok, Thailand || Decision || 5 || 3:00

|- style="background:#cfc;"
| 1990-08-25|| Win||align=left| Pornsak Muangsurin || Lumpinee Stadium || Bangkok, Thailand || Decision || 5 || 3:00

|- style="background:#fbb;"O
| 1990-08-03|| Loss ||align=left| Kompayak Singmanee || Lumpinee Stadium || Bangkok, Thailand || Decision || 5 || 3:00

|- style="background:#fbb;"
| 1990-06-29|| Loss ||align=left| Tukatathong Por Pongsawang || Lumpinee Stadium || Bangkok, Thailand || Decision || 5 || 3:00

|- style="background:#cfc;"
| 1990-06-08 || Win ||align=left| Krirkchai Sor Ketalingchan || Lumpinee Stadium || Bangkok, Thailand || Decision|| 5 || 3:00

|- style="background:#fbb;"
| 1990-05-01|| Loss ||align=left| Tukatathong Por Pongsawang || Lumpinee Stadium || Bangkok, Thailand || Decision || 5 || 3:00

|- style="background:#fbb;"
| 1990-04-10|| Loss ||align=left| Karuhat Sor.Supawan || Lumpinee Stadium || Bangkok, Thailand || Decision || 5 || 3:00
|-
! style=background:white colspan=9 |

|- style="background:#cfc;"
| 1990-03-06 || Win ||align=left| Toto Por Pongsawang || Lumpinee Stadium || Bangkok, Thailand || Decision|| 5 || 3:00

|- style="background:#fbb;"
| 1990-01-19 || Loss ||align=left| Toto Por Pongsawang || Lumpinee Stadium || Bangkok, Thailand || KO (High kick)|| 5 ||

|- style="background:#cfc;"
| 1989-12-18 || Win ||align=left| Chainoi Muangsurin || Lumpinee Stadium || Bangkok, Thailand || Decision || 5 || 3:00

|- style="background:#fbb;"
| 1989-11-28 || Loss ||align=left| Namkabuan Nongkeepahuyuth || Lumpinee Stadium || Bangkok, Thailand || Decision || 5 || 3:00

|- style="background:#fbb;"
| 1989-11-07 || Loss||align=left| Oley Kiatoneway || Lumpinee Stadium || Bangkok, Thailand || Decision || 5|| 3:00

|- style="text-align:center; background:#cfc;"
| 1989-10-20|| Win ||align=left| Paruhatlek Sitchunthong || Lumpinee Stadium || Bangkok, Thailand ||Decision || 5 || 3:00

|- style="text-align:center; background:#c5d2ea;"
| 1989-09-08|| Draw||align=left| Paruhatlek Sitchunthong || Lumpinee Stadium || Bangkok, Thailand ||Decision || 5 || 3:00

|- style="text-align:center; background:#c5d2ea;"
| 1989-08-15|| Draw||align=left| Paruhatlek Sitchunthong || Lumpinee Stadium || Bangkok, Thailand ||Decision || 5 || 3:00

|- style="background:#cfc;"
| 1989-07-25 || Win ||align=left| Pongsiri Por Ruamrudee || Lumpinee Stadium || Bangkok, Thailand || Decision || 5 || 3:00

|- style="text-align:center; background:#c5d2ea;"
| 1989-05-30|| Draw||align=left| Paruhatlek Sitchunthong || Lumpinee Stadium || Bangkok, Thailand ||Decision || 5 || 3:00

|- style="background:#fbb;"
| 1989-05-02 || Loss ||align=left| Mawin Sor.Ploenchit || || Korat, Thailand || Decision || 5 || 3:00

|- style="background:#cfc;"
| 1989-04-07 || Win ||align=left| Seesot Sahakarnosot || Lumpinee Stadium || Bangkok, Thailand || Decision || 5 || 3:00

|- style="background:#cfc;"
| 1989-02-24 || Win ||align=left| Denthaksin Kiatratthapol || Lumpinee Stadium || Bangkok, Thailand || Decision || 5 || 3:00

|- style="background:#cfc;"
| 1989-01-31 || Win ||align=left| Mawin Sor.Ploenchit || Lumpinee Stadium || Bangkok, Thailand || Decision || 5 || 3:00

|- style="background:#fbb;"
| 1988-12-02 || Loss ||align=left| Toto Por.Pongsawang ||  Lumpinee Stadium ||  Bangkok, Thailand  || Decision || 5 || 3:00

|- style="background:#fbb;"
| 1988-11-04 || Loss||align=left| Pongsiri Por Ruamrudee || Lumpinee Stadium || Bangkok, Thailand || Decision || 5 || 3:00

|- style="background:#c5d2ea;"
| 1988-10-11 || Draw||align=left| Pongsiri Por Ruamrudee || Lumpinee Stadium || Bangkok, Thailand || Decision || 5 || 3:00

|- style="background:#cfc;"
| 1988-08-30|| Win||align=left| Kompayak Singmanee || Lumpinee Stadium || Bangkok, Thailand || Decision || 5 || 3:00
|-
! style=background:white colspan=9 |

|- style="background:#cfc;"
| 1988-07-08 || Win||align=left| Pungluang Kiatanan || Lumpinee Stadium || Bangkok, Thailand || Decision || 5 || 3:00

|- style="background:#c5d2ea;"
| 1988-06-10 || Draw||align=left| Seksan Sitchomthong || Lumpinee Stadium || Bangkok, Thailand || Decision || 5 || 3:00

|- style="background:#fbb;"
| 1988-05-03 || Loss ||align=left| Karuhat Sor.Supawan || Lumpinee Stadium || Bangkok, Thailand || Decision || 5 || 3:00

|- style="background:#cfc;"
| 1988-03-25 || Win||align=left| Morakot Sor Tamarangsri || Lumpinee Stadium || Bangkok, Thailand || Decision || 5 || 3:00

|- style="background:#fbb;"
| 1988-03-04 || Loss ||align=left| Morakot Sor Tamarangsri || Lumpinee Stadium || Bangkok, Thailand || Decision || 5 || 3:00

|- style="background:#cfc;"
| 1988-02-02 || Win ||align=left| Toto Por Pongsawang || Lumpinee Stadium || Bangkok, Thailand || Decision || 5 || 3:00

|- style="background:#cfc;"
| 1987-12-29 || Win ||align=left| Toto Por Pongsawang || Lumpinee Stadium || Bangkok, Thailand || Decision || 5 || 3:00

|- style="background:#;"
| 1987-10-27 || ||align=left| Seksan Sitchomthong || Lumpinee Stadium || Bangkok, Thailand || || || 

|- style="background:#cfc;"
| 1987-10-02 ||Win ||align=left| Kompayak Singmanee || Lumpinee Stadium || Bangkok, Thailand || Decision||5 ||3:00

|- style="background:#cfc;"
| 1987-09-01 || Win||align=left| Amnatsak Sor.Sinsawad || Lumpinee Stadium || Bangkok, Thailand || Decision || 5 || 3:00

|- style="background:#fbb;"
| 1987-07-31 || Loss ||align=left| Karuhat Sor.Supawan || Lumpinee Stadium || Bangkok, Thailand || Decision || 5 || 3:00

|- style="text-align:center; background:#cfc;"
| 1986-12-10|| Win ||align=left| Morakot Sor.Thammarangsri || Huamark Stadium Samart Payakaroon vs Juan Meza || Bangkok, Thailand || Decision || 5 || 3:00

|- style="text-align:center; background:#cfc;"
| 1986-10-14|| Win ||align=left| Hippy Singmanee || Lumpinee Stadium || Bangkok, Thailand || Decision || 5 || 3:00

|- style="text-align:center; background:#cfc;"
| 1986-03-04|| Win ||align=left| Mongkolchai Ekamorn || Lumpinee Stadium || Bangkok, Thailand || Decision || 5 || 3:00

|- style="background:#fbb;"
| 1985-12-06 || Loss ||align=left| Boonmee Sitchuchon || Lumpinee Stadium || Bangkok, Thailand || Decision || 5 || 3:00

|- style="text-align:center; background:#cfc;"
| 1985-09-20|| Win ||align=left| Dokmaipa Por Pongsawang || Lumpinee Stadium || Bangkok, Thailand || Decision || 5 || 3:00

|- style="text-align:center; background:#cfc;"
| 1985-07-12|| Win ||align=left| Saenchai Luksawong|| Lumpinee Stadium || Bangkok, Thailand || Decision || 5 || 3:00

|- style="background:#fbb;"
| 1985-06-04 || Loss ||align=left| Rengromnoi Davy || Lumpinee Stadium Anniversary show|| Bangkok, Thailand || Decision || 5 || 3:00

|-
| colspan=9 | Legend:

References

Pairojnoi Sor Siamchai
Living people
1968 births
Muay Thai trainers
Pairojnoi Sor Siamchai